Players is an American comedy series which premiered on the Spike network on March 2, 2010. The series is a partially scripted/mostly improvised comedy about two brothers who run a sports bar together. After airing 3 episodes, Players was removed from the Spike schedule and put on hiatus. The remaining seven episodes from season one were pushed back to air beginning July 21, 2010. Spike aired the final four episodes back-to-back on August 14, 2010.

Premise
Creator Matt Walsh stars as fun-loving Bruce who runs a sports bar with his uptight older brother Ken, played by Ian Roberts. June Diane Raphael and Danielle Schneider co-star as Barb and Krista, the bar's waitresses. The cast also features James Pumphrey as Calvin, the young bartender who lives in the storage room and Jack McGee as Hickey, a retired police officer who spends most of his time hanging out at the bar betting on games.

Guests stars included Matt Besser, Rob Huebel, Ken Jeong, Andrew Daly, Cathy Shim, Joseph Nunez, Paul Scheer and Horatio Sanz.

Cast
Matt Walsh as Bruce Fitzgerald
Ian Roberts as Ken Fitzgerald
June Diane Raphael as Barb Tolan
Danielle Schneider as Krista DiMarco
James Pumphrey as Calvin Trout
Jack McGee as Hickey

Episodes

References

External links
 

2010 American television series debuts
2010 American television series endings
2010s American sitcoms
2010s American workplace comedy television series
Spike (TV network) original programming